The 2020 Suncorp Super Netball season was the fourth season of the premier netball league in Australia. The season was originally scheduled to commence on 2 May, though was delayed to 1 August due to the COVID-19 pandemic. The defending premiers, New South Wales Swifts were eliminated in the first week of the finals series by the eventual runners-up West Coast Fever. The premiers were the Melbourne Vixens, who defeated the Fever by two goals in the Grand Final at Nissan Arena in Brisbane.

Overview

Teams

Format
The season is played over fourteen rounds, allowing every team to play each other twice, once at home and once away. The top four teams on the ladder at the conclusion of the regular season qualify for the finals series. In the first week of the finals series, the 1st ranked team hosts the 2nd ranked team in the major semi-final (with the winner of that match to qualify for the Grand Final) and the 3rd ranked team hosts the 4th ranked team in the minor semi-final (with the loser of that match eliminated). The loser of the major semi-final then hosts the winner of the minor semi-final in the preliminary final. The winner of the major semi-final then hosts the winner of the preliminary final in the Grand Final.

Rule changes
The Super Netball commission announced changes to the league structure in February. Rolling substitutions during play will be permitted, as well as during stoppages and intervals, with no limit to the number of substitutions that can be made, and multiple substitutions allowed to be made at any one time. The substitute must tag hands with the player leaving the court before entering the field of play. Extra time in the event of draws was introduced, after six matches were tied throughout the previous season. The match was to enter one 5-minute period of extra time. If at the end of this period teams remain tied, the match was to have been declared a draw. If a team has a one-goal or greater advantage at the end of the period, they would have been declared the winner. The bonus point system in place for the past two seasons was also supposed to remain in place. However, in the days leading up to the season, the league announced it had scrapped bonus points and extra time, citing the need to mitigate the physical impact of the condensed fixture on the players. Teams were also allowed to increase their match-day squads to 12 players, up from 10 in previous years.

Two-goal super shots
After confirming the return of the league on 1 August, competition administrators announced the introduction of the two-point shot rule alteration. The new rule allows a score of two goals to be awarded to any shooter or attacker who scores in the two-goal zone outside the usual goal circle. The move was met with disapproval from many fans and players, though Super Netball CEO Chris Symington argued "the time is right to introduce an innovation that will make the game even more dynamic and unpredictable". The two-goal shot zone will only be activated in the final five minutes of each quarter and in the five-minute extra time period.

Relocation to Queensland
As a result of an increase in COVID-19 positive tests in Victoria, the league initially announced the temporary relocation of the two Victorian teams (Magpies and Vixens) to Queensland. Shortly afterwards, the league revealed it had come to an arrangement with the Queensland Government to move all clubs to a hub in South-East Queensland, thereby allowing a condensed fixture, with most matches played in Brisbane, Gold Coast, Sunshine Coast, Cairns and Townsville. The two Victorian clubs were required to serve a 14-day quarantine prior to the start of the season.

Player transfers
The league unveiled the list of non-contracted athletes on 14 August 2019, two weeks before that season's finals series were scheduled to commence. Teams had the exclusive right to re-sign any of their existing contracted players, their permanent/temporary replacement players or training partners, on single year or multi-year contracts for the 2020 and 2021 seasons. Contracts with players from other teams and leagues could not be announced until the signing period commenced on 16 September 2019. This period closed on 14 October 2019, upon which teams were required to have submitted their 10 senior-listed players for the 2020 season. Training partners could be signed by clubs at any time.

Signings
The following table is a list of players who moved clubs/leagues into Super Netball, or were elevated into a permanent position in the senior team, during the off-season. It does not include players who were re-signed by their original Super Netball clubs.

† Indicates player was signed as an injury-replacement player

Pre-season

Bushfire Relief Match
In January 2020, Netball Australia announced an All-Stars match for the pre-season featuring the Australian Diamonds and the best players from the Super Netball league. The match was played as a fundraiser for relief efforts for the 2019–20 Australian bushfire season, which had been particularly devastating. The teams were announced on 29 January 2020.

Team Girls Cup
The league's pre-season tournament, known as the Suncorp Team Girls Cup, was set to return for the second time. The tournament would have taken place between 27 and 29 March at the refurbished Ken Rosewall Arena.

However, on 13 March 2020, the league announced that the event would be cancelled due to the COVID-19 pandemic.

Regular season
 The original fixture was abandoned due to the COVID-19 pandemic. The league unveiled six rounds of the revised fixture on 24 July 2020, though subsequent announcements of travel restrictions in Australia forced those fixtures to be re-arranged.

Round 1

Round 2

Round 3

Round 4

Round 5

Round 6

Round 7

Round 8

Round 9

Round 10

Round 11

Round 12

Round 13

Round 14

Ladder

Finals series

Major semi-final

Minor semi-final

Preliminary final

Grand Final

 Grand Final MVP Winner: Mwai Kumwenda

Awards
The following players were awarded for their performances in the 2020 season:

 The Player of the Year Award was won by Jhaniele Fowler.
 The Grand Final MVP Award was won by Mwai Kumwenda of the Melbourne Vixens.
 The Rising Star Award was won by Maisie Nankivell of the Adelaide Thunderbirds.
 The Joyce Brown Coach of the Year award was won by Simone McKinnis of the Melbourne Vixens.
 The Leading Goalscorer Award was won by Jhaniele Fowler of the West Coast Fever, who scored 795 goals in the regular season, and 979 goals after finals.
 The following players were named in the Super Netball Team of the Year:

Defenders 
 Goal Keeper: Geva Mentor(Collingwood Magpies)
 Goal Defence: Karla Pretorius(Sunshine Coast Lightning)

Midcourters 
 Wing Defence: Gabi Simpson(Queensland Firebirds)
 Centre: Kate Moloney(Melbourne Vixens)
 Wing Attack: Liz Watson(Melbourne Vixens)

Attackers 
 Goal Attack: Kiera Austin(Giants Netball)
 Goal Shooter: Jhaniele Fowler(West Coast Fever)

Reserves 
 Attack Reserve: Cara Koenen(Sunshine Coast Lightning)
 Micourt Reserve: Paige Hadley(New South Wales Swifts)
 Defence Reserve: Shamera Sterling(Adelaide Thunderbirds)

References

External links
 

2020
2020 in Australian netball
Super Netball season